Jochem Douma (23 November 1931 – 7 November 2020) was a Dutch theologian and ethicist. He was ordained in the Reformed Churches in the Netherlands, having studied at its Theological College in Kampen and at the University of Amsterdam. He served as a pastor before being appointed as Professor of Ethics at Kampen in 1970, where he served until his retirement in 1997.

Douma wrote a fifteen-volume series called Ethical Reflections, as well as a series of biblical commentaries.

In 2014 Douma left the Liberated churches to join the Reformed Churches in the Netherlands (Restored).

References

1931 births
2020 deaths
Dutch Calvinist and Reformed theologians
Reformed Churches (Liberated) Christians from the Netherlands
Christian ethicists
Bible commentators
University of Amsterdam alumni
Theological University of the Reformed Churches alumni